The Squadrone Volante (from the Italian, meaning Flying Squadron) or New Party was a political grouping in Scotland which emerged around 1700 as an offshoot of the opposition Country Party. Led by John Ker, 5th Earl of Roxburghe and John Hay, 2nd Marquess of Tweeddale, the party was influential in passing the Act of Union with England in 1707.

The members of the squadrone, which eventually totalled 25, were generally moderate Presbyterians who opposed both Episopalians and the Jacobites. Although the actual grouping pre-dated 1705, it received the nickname squadrone volante in that year, as it was independent of the Court and Country parties in the Scottish Parliament.

The members of the Squadrone Volante were:

Thomas Hamilton, 6th Earl of Haddington
Patrick Hume, 1st Earl of Marchmont
James Graham, 4th Marquess of Montrose
John Hamilton-Leslie, 9th Earl of Rothes
John Ker, 5th Earl of Roxburghe
James Sandilands, 7th Lord Torphichen
John Hay, 2nd Marquess of Tweeddale
Sir William Anstruther of that Ilk, Commissioner for Fife
George Baillie of Jerviswood, Commissioner for Lanarkshire
Captain William Bennet of Grubbet, Commissioner for Roxburghshire
John Bruce of Kinross, Commissioner for Kinross-shire
Sir Thomas Burnett of Leys, 3rd Baronet, Commissioner for Kincardineshire
Sir Alexander Campbell of Cessnock, Commissioner for Berwickshire
John Cockburn of Ormiston, Commissioner for Haddingtonshire
Robert Dundas of Arniston, Commissioner for Edinburghshire
Mungo Graham of Gorthie, Commissioner for Perthshire
John Haldane of Gleneagles, Commissioner for Perthshire
James Halyburton of Pitcur, Commissioner for Forfarshire
Sir William Kerr of Greenhead, 3rd Baronet, Commissioner for Roxburghshire
William Nisbet of Dirleton, Commissioner for Haddingtonshire
Patrick Bruce of Banzion, Commissioner for Cupar
Sir John Erskine of Alva, 3rd Baronet, Commissioner for Burntisland
Sir Peter Halkett of Pitfirrane, 1st Baronet, Commissioner for Dunfermline
Sir Andrew Hume of Kimmerghame, Commissioner for Kirkcudbright
James Spittal of Leuchat, Commissioner for Inverkeithing

References

Organizations established in 1705
18th century in Scotland
Defunct political parties in Scotland
1705 establishments in Scotland
1707 disestablishments in Scotland